Sarah Cowper (14 February 1644 – 3 February 1720) was an English diarist.

Early life 
Sarah Holled was born in Eastcheap in London as the only child of merchant Samuel Holled. Both her parents died before she was 20, and as the only heir to her parents' estate she inherited roughly £1000. On 11 April 1664 Sarah married a lawyer, William Cowper, who at the end of that same year inherited the baronetcy Cowper, as well as properties in London and Kent from his grandfather. The couple would go one to have four sons, notably among them William Cowper and Spencer Cowper.

However, the couple where extremely unhappy with Sarah commenting on the complete emotional incompatibility by saying "Never met two more Averse than we in Humour, Passions, and Affections; our Reason and Sense Religion or Morals agree not". Her husband's income was inadequate for his rank, and so the couple maintained only modest rented homes in London, with a county seat of Hertford Castle which at that time was small and run-down. This relative lack of wealth for the title of baron only aggravated marital disputes.

One response to her family situation and isolation was the compiling of a commonplace book, a collection of excerpts from her readings arranged under alphabetical headings.In it were preserved two manuscripts of Abraham Cowley's fragmentary epic The Civil War.

In 1699 Spencer was tried for the murder of a Quaker woman Sarah Stout, and although later acquitted, her husbands political career would never recover. It was in large part the response to the trial, combined with her dissatisfaction at her domestic conditions, that Sarah would begin whiting he diary the following years.

Diarist 
Cowper would begin her diary in July 1700 and continue until 1716, when her failing eyesight and frail hands forced her to stop. For those 16 years it covered, in detail, all portions of her life, including her feelings about her family, the politics of the time and current gossip, all presented from within her sternly moralistic framework. Indead it seems that she originally treated the work as a spiritual diary, allowing her to vent her own frustrations as well as serving as a devotional aid. These two strands, the personal and the spiritual, would pervade the whole work.

Much of the work was compiled from other texts, incorporating the words of different writers seamlessly into her own observations, often without signalling to the reader when she was doing so. It was a habit that she admitted to; "if other men’s sentences were left out, the pages would be void". This 'borrowing' gave her observations literary cadence and lent them an air of authority.

Later life 
When Sir William Cowper would die on the 26 November 1706, making her financially independent, Sarah Cowper would embark on a programme of philanthropy. She enjoyed her widowhood greatly commenting "Methinks I taste and feel that liberty is sweet". She would spend most of her time reading, writing, visiting others and going to church. she died on 3 February 1720 and was buried St Mary's Church, Hertingfordbury, Hertfordshire, where a monument was erected praising her "industry, virtue, wisdom, and piety".

Family 
Her son William Cowper would become a politician and was the first Lord High Chancellor. Another of her sons Spencer Cowper was a lawyer and MP. Through Spencer she would be grand-mother to the poet Judith Madan and great-grand-mother to the hymn-writer William Cowper

References

Citations

Bibliography

Further reading 
 
 

1644 births
1720 deaths
Women diarists
People from the City of London
English diarists